Harmony Township, Ohio, may refer to:

Harmony Township, Clark County, Ohio
Harmony Township, Morrow County, Ohio

Ohio township disambiguation pages